Statistics of Japan Football League in the 1998 season.

Overview

The 1998 season was the seventh and the last of the former Japan Football League. It was contested by 16 teams, and Tokyo Gas won the championship. After the season, nine teams together with J. League Promotion and Relegation series' losers Consadole Sapporo formed the second division of J.League. Other seven clubs together with Regional Leagues promotion series winners Yokogawa Electric and newly created Yokohama FC have formed the new Japan Football League.

Table

Results

Promotion and relegation
Kawasaki Frontale were awarded a spot in the first round of J.League Promotion and Relegation Series where they have played against Avispa Fukuoka.

Avispa proceeded to the next round and Frontale entered the second division.

Successor seasons
1999 J.League Division 2
1999 Japan Football League

1996
2
Japan
Japan